Fabrizio Spada (Rome, 17 March 1643 – Rome, 15 June 1717) was an Italian Cardinal of the Roman Catholic Church, and served as Secretary of State under Pope Innocent XII.

Life

Born on March 17, 1643, in Rome, he was the son of Orazio Spada and Veralli Maria. He was also a great-nephew of Cardinal Bernardino Spada and a nephew of Cardinal Giambattista Spada on his father's side, and a nephew of Cardinal Fabrizio Verallo on his mother's side. His sister, Eugenia Spada (1639–1717) married Girolamo Mattei, Duca di Giove of the House of Mattei. Spada completed his studies as a doctor of law ("in utroque iure") at the University of Perugia in 1664; after which he took holy orders on December 22, 1669. He was subsequently appointed referendary to the Apostolic Signatura and Lay Abbot of the monastery of Santa Maria d' Attilia, in the diocese of San Severino.

In 1672 he became titular Latin Archbishop of Patras but had to obtain a dispensation because he was still below canonical age, and papal nuncio to the duchy of Savoy. On August 14, 1672, he was consecrated bishop by Gasparo Carpegna, Cardinal-Priest of Santa Pudenziana with Alessandro Crescenzi (cardinal), titular Latin patriarch of Alexandria, and Bernardino Rocci, titular archbishop of Damasco, serving as co-consecrators. Two years later on January 3, 1674, he was appointed Apostolic Nuncio to France. Pope Clement X created him cardinal-priest in the consistory of 27 May 1675, and he was given the titulus of San Callisto. This was exchanged in 1689 for that of San Crisogono and in 1708 for that of Santa Prassede.

He was appointed legate to Urbino in 1686 and served as Camerlengo of the Sacred College of Cardinals from 1688 to 1689. Finally he achieved his most senior appointment as Cardinal Secretary of State, serving from 1691 to 1700 under the papacy of Innocent XII. In 1710 he became cardinal-bishop of the Roman see of Palestrina. Other titles included Prefect for the Congregation of Good Government (now suppressed), archpriest of the Basilica of St. John Lateran, and Secretary for the Holy Office or Inquisition from 1716 until his death. As cardinal he also participated in the papal conclaves of 1676, 1689, 1691 and 1700.

He died in the family palace in Rome, and his body was laid out for viewing in the church of Santa Maria in Vallicella before being interred within the Spada family chapel.

Episcopal succession
{| role="presentation" class="wikitable mw-collapsible mw-collapsed"|
! style="background:#F5DEB3"|  Episcopal succession of Fabrizio Spada
|-
|
While bishop, he was the principal consecrator of:
Giovanni Carlo Antonelli, Bishop of Ferentino (1677);
Alfonso de Aloysio, Bishop of Squillace (1688);
Michelangelo Mattei, Titular Archbishop of Hadrianopolis in Haemimonto (1689);
Marco de Rama, Bishop of Crotone (1690);
Giorgio Parchich, Bishop of Nona (1690);
Ferdinando Strozza, Titular Archbishop of Tarsus (1690);
Francesco Picarelli, Bishop of Narni (1690);
Lorenzo Maria Fieschi (de Flisco), Archbishop of Avignon (1690);
Baldassare Cenci (seniore), Titular Archbishop of Larissa in Thessalia (1691);
Giovanni Giacomo Cavallerini, Titular Archbishop of Nicaea (1692);
Alessandro Lambert, Bishop of Aosta (1692);
Gerolamo Ubertino Provana, Bishop of Alba (1692);
Pierre Lambert Ledrou, Titular Bishop of Porphyreon (1692);
Eligio Caracciolo, Archbishop of Cosenza (1694);
Francesco Azzolini, Bishop of Ripatransone (1694);
Luigi Capuani (Ludovico Capulani), Bishop of Ravello e Scala (1694);
Muzio Gaeta, Archbishop of Bari (1698);
Tommaso Ruffo, Titular Archbishop of Nicaea (1698);
Giambattista Patrizi, Titular Archbishop of Seleucia in Isauria (1702); and
Carlo Maria Mascardi, Bishop of Ventimiglia (1710).
|}

References

Renata Ago, Carriere e clientele nella Roma barocca'', Roma-Bari, Laterza, 1990.

1643 births
1717 deaths
18th-century Italian cardinals
University of Perugia alumni
Cardinal-bishops of Palestrina
Cardinal Secretaries of State
Latin archbishops of Patras